A cold weather rule or cold weather law is a law or regulation that prohibits public utility companies from disconnecting customers who are unable to pay for the energy used to heat their homes during the winter.  Such regulations may also require utility companies to reconnect customers during those periods.  Several U.S. states have such rules, including Kansas, Minnesota, and Missouri.  The protection provided by a cold weather rule may not be automatic, and poor customers may have to register with their service provider to indicate either a complete inability to pay or to set up a special payment plan.

In Minnesota, the rule is in effect between October 15 and April 15 of the next year, and requires reconnection of electricity and/or natural gas depending on which energy sources are necessary for heat.  The state's Public Utilities Commission doesn't regulate liquefied petroleum gas or oil, so those services may not be provided.  However, if an LP- or oil-fired heater requires electricity in order to function, the rule requires electrical service to be reconnected.

In addition to providing warmth for residents, cold weather rules help prevent damage to homes. Wintertime temperatures can freeze Water pipes, potentially causing bursts in the lines as the water inside expands as it turns into ice.  Cleaning up after this can lay heavy burdens upon people who are already of limited financial means.

Kansas law
Minnesota law
Missouri law